Time for Reflection is an early American television program that aired on the DuMont Television Network.  Newspapers from the time period show Time For Reflection began airing on June 27, 1949 as a daily 5-minute program, Monday through Friday from 5:25 pm – 5:30 pm.  It appears to have finished its run on January 19, 1951.  By the time the program finished its run it was airing as a 10-minute program, 5:15 pm – 5:25 pm.

The series consisted of poetry and inspirational prose read by host David Ross (1891-1975).

At least one Kinescope from December 1950 is known to exist at UCLA, and is narrated by Fred Scott, long time DuMont announcer and Communications Officer Rogers on Captain Video.

See also
 List of programs broadcast by the DuMont Television Network
 List of surviving DuMont Television Network broadcasts
 1950-51 United States network television schedule

References

Bibliography

Tim Brooks and Earle Marsh, The Complete Directory to Prime Time Network TV Shows, Third edition (New York: Ballantine Books, 1964)

External links
DuMont Television Network Historical Web Site

DuMont Television Network original programming
1950 American television series debuts
1951 American television series endings
Black-and-white American television shows